Boca del Río may refer to:
Boca del Río, Veracruz, Mexico
Boca del Río, Nueva Esparta, Venezuela